Gunter-Summers House, also known as the Henry Jacob Summers House, is a historic home located at West Columbia, Lexington County, South Carolina. It was built in 1895, and is an I-house with Queen Anne style decorative elements with an Eastlake theme, notably the geometric banded frieze and geometric stained glass doors with running trim. It is a two-story, frame dwelling and has weatherboard siding and a brick pier foundation. The front façade features a two-tiered, full-width front porch.  Also on the property are a barn (c. 1900) and a smokehouse (c. 1910) with a braced overhanging front gable.

It was listed on the National Register of Historic Places in 1987.

References 

Houses on the National Register of Historic Places in South Carolina
Queen Anne architecture in South Carolina
Houses completed in 1895
Houses in Lexington County, South Carolina
National Register of Historic Places in Lexington County, South Carolina